Red Stallion in the Rockies is a 1949 American Cinecolor Western film directed by Ralph Murphy and starring Arthur Franz

Plot
Stranded circus men save a mare-happy trick horse hunted by Colorado ranchers.

Cast
 Arthur Franz as Thad Avery
 Jean Heather as Cynthia "Cindy" Smith
 Jim Davis as Dave Ryder
 Ray Collins as Matthew "Matt" Simpson
 Wallace Ford as "Talky" Carson
 Leatrice Joy as Martha Simpson
 James Kirkwood as Judge Hardy
 Dynamite as The Red Stallion

External links 

1949 films
1949 Western (genre) films
Films directed by Ralph Murphy
Eagle-Lion Films films
Cinecolor films
Films about horses
American Western (genre) films
1940s English-language films
1940s American films